This is a list of airlines of Nova Scotia which have an air operator's certificate issued by Transport Canada, the country's civil aviation authority. These are airlines that are based in Nova Scotia.

Current airlines

Defunct airlines

References

Nova Scotia
Aviation in Nova Scotia
Airlines